Titanoptilus rufus is a moth of the family Pterophoridae. It is known from Madagascar.

References

Pterophorinae
Moths described in 1994
Moths of Madagascar